Dorian Boccolacci (born 9 September 1998 in Cannes) is a French racing driver, currently competing in the Porsche Supercup series. He has previously also competed in the FIA Formula 2 Championship until after the 2019 French round at Circuit Paul Ricard, where he was replaced by Arjun Maini.

Career

Karting
Born in Cannes, Boccolacci began karting in 2007 at the age of nine, competing in competitions across Europe.

Lower Formulae
In 2014, Boccolacci graduated to single-seaters, competing in the French F4 Championship. There he scored two victories, pole positions and fastest laps and finished as Junior champion and runner-up in the overall standings.

European Formula 3
In 2015, Boccolacci switched to European Formula 3, racing with Signature in the 2015 season. In contrast to his season in French F4, Boccolacci only finished twelfth in the rookie championship and nineteenth in the overall standings.

Formula Renault 2.0
Boccolacci joined Tech 1 Racing for the 2016 seasons. Scoring three wins across both series, Boccolacci finished runner-up in the Eurocup standings and third overall in NEC.

GP3 Series

In November 2016, Boccolacci made his GP3 debut in the post-season test at Yas Marina with Arden International and DAMS. In March 2017, Boccolacci joined Trident Racing for testing ahead of the 2017 season He was signed to race with the team in May 2017, where he achieved a race win and sixth in the championship. Boccolacci returned for the following season, switching to newcomers MP Motorsport.

Formula E
In March 2018, Boccolacci was named as one of eight drivers to be signed to the Venturi Formula E team's new Next Gen Programme.

Formula 2

2018 
On 22 August 2018 Roberto Merhi left the FIA Formula 2 Championship, and MP Motorsport promoted the French driver for the next round at Spa-Francorchamps. In the GP3 Series, Richard Verschoor replaced him at the team. Later, Merhi joined the Campos Racing team for the Sochi round, replacing Roy Nissany.

2019 
On 22 March 2019 it was announced that Dorian would join Campos Racing for the 2019 season alongside Jack Aitken. Dorian struggled in the opening rounds in Bahrain but performed well on the street circuits of Baku and Monaco with a high of 4th place in the Monaco feature race. After suffering from mechanical failure in the feature race at his home race at Circuit Paul Ricard, Boccolacci recovered to 13th in the sprint race.

On 25 June 2019, Arjun Maini was announced as replacing Boccolacci in Campos Racing, shortly followed by Boccolacci announcing on social media that Paul Ricard was his last race in Formula 2. However, after missing the next round in Austria, Boccolacci secured a drive with Trident Racing for the Silverstone race weekend in July.

Racing record

Career summary

† As Boccolacci was a guest driver, he was ineligible for championship points.
* Season still in progress.

Complete French F4 Championship results 
(key) (Races in bold indicate pole position) (Races in italics indicate fastest lap)

Complete FIA Formula 3 European Championship results
(key) (Races in bold indicate pole position) (Races in italics indicate fastest lap)

Complete Formula Renault Eurocup results
(key) (Races in bold indicate pole position) (Races in italics indicate fastest lap)

Complete GP3 Series results
(key) (Races in bold indicate pole position) (Races in italics indicate fastest lap)

† Driver did not finish the race, but was classified as he completed over 90% of the race distance.

Complete FIA Formula 2 Championship results
(key) (Races in bold indicate pole position) (Races in italics indicate points for the fastest lap of top ten finishers)

Complete Blancpain GT World Challenge Europe results
(key) (Races in bold indicate pole position) (Races in italics indicate fastest lap)

Complete ADAC GT Masters results
(key) (Races in bold indicate pole position) (Races in italics indicate fastest lap)

Complete Porsche Supercup results
(key) (Races in bold indicate pole position) (Races in italics indicate fastest lap)

References

External links
 
 

1998 births
Living people
Sportspeople from Cannes
French racing drivers
French F4 Championship drivers
Formula Renault Eurocup drivers
Formula Renault 2.0 NEC drivers
FIA Formula 3 European Championship drivers
French GP3 Series drivers
FIA Formula 2 Championship drivers
MP Motorsport drivers
Euroformula Open Championship drivers
Blancpain Endurance Series drivers
ADAC GT Masters drivers
Porsche Supercup drivers
Auto Sport Academy drivers
Signature Team drivers
Tech 1 Racing drivers
Teo Martín Motorsport drivers
Trident Racing drivers
Campos Racing drivers
Karting World Championship drivers
Audi Sport drivers
Nürburgring 24 Hours drivers
Saintéloc Racing drivers
Lamborghini Super Trofeo drivers
Porsche Carrera Cup Germany drivers